Marek Tomasz Surmacz (born 31 January 1955 in Gorzów Wielkopolski) is a Polish politician. He was elected to the Sejm on 25 September 2005, getting 8386 votes in 8 Zielona Góra district as a candidatefrom the Law and Justice list.

See also
Members of Polish Sejm 2005-2007

External links
Marek Surmacz - parliamentary page - includes declarations of interest, voting record, and transcripts of speeches.

1955 births
Living people
People from Gorzów Wielkopolski
Members of the Polish Sejm 2005–2007
Law and Justice politicians